San Emiliano is a parish (administrative division) in Allande, a municipality within the province and autonomous community of Asturias, in northern Spain.

The postal code is 33885.

Villages and hamlets
 Bevarasao (Bevaraso)
 Bojo (Boxo)
 Buslavín (Busllavín)
 Ema
 Fresnedo (Freisnedo)
 Murias
 La Quintana (A Quintá)
 Vallinas (Vallías)
 Villadecabo
 San Emiliano (Santo Miyao)

References

External links
 Allande 

Parishes in Allande